The 2020 hurricane season may refer to:
2020 Atlantic hurricane season
2020 Pacific hurricane season
2020 Pacific typhoon season
2019–20 South-West Indian Ocean cyclone season
2019–20 Australian region cyclone season
2019–20 South Pacific cyclone season
2020 North Indian Ocean cyclone season
2020–21 South-West Indian Ocean cyclone season
2020–21 Australian region cyclone season
2020–21 South Pacific cyclone season